This article shows the 2016 season of South Korean football.

National team results

Senior team

Under-23 team

K League

K League Classic

K League Challenge

Promotion-relegation playoffs
The promotion-relegation playoffs were held between the winners of the 2016 K League Challenge playoffs and the 11th-placed club of the 2016 K League Classic. The winner on aggregate score after both matches earned entry into the 2017 K League Classic.

1–1 on aggregate. Gangwon FC won on away goals and were promoted to the K League Classic, while Seongnam FC were relegated to the K League Challenge.

Korean FA Cup

Korea National League

WK League

Table

Playoff and championship

AFC Champions League

FIFA Club World Cup

See also
Football in South Korea

References

External links

 
Seasons in South Korean football